Garden Lake is a lake in Lake County, in the U.S. state of Minnesota.

Garden Lake was named from the fact the Ojibwe Indians planted their crops there. Garden Lake is connected to Fall Lake by a short stream.

See also
List of lakes in Minnesota

References

Lakes of Minnesota
Lakes of Lake County, Minnesota